Glenn Critch (June 27, 1954 – ) was a Canadian professional ice hockey player.

He began his career with the St. John's Capital's, earning the title of Senior Rookie of the Year 1974-75.  

During the 1976–77 season Critch played three games in the World Hockey Association (WHA) with the Indianapolis Racers. He returned to St. John's in 1976 and rejoined the Capital's (called the "Caps" locally), with whom he won the Herder Memorial Trophy twice. Overall, his provincial senior career lasted eight years, and he totalled 132 goals and 250 points in only 118 games. He earned a place of 11th best Newfoundland hockey player of all time with 15 goals and 24 points in Allan Cup play.

Critch was inducted into the player category of the Newfoundland and Labrador Hockey Hall of Fame in June, 2017.

References

External links

1946 births
2011 deaths
Canadian ice hockey centres
Ice hockey people from Newfoundland and Labrador
Indianapolis Racers players
Sportspeople from St. John's, Newfoundland and Labrador